Carlos Queiroz is a Portuguese football coach.

Carlos Queiroz may also refer to:

Carlos de Sousa Queirós, Angolan football coach
Carlos Queiroz (sport shooter), Portuguese Olympic shooter